Below is a list of radio stations in Iloilo City and Iloilo Province, whose coverage is in part or whole of the same.

AM Stations

FM Stations

References

Iloilo